Lucerapex pulcherrimus is an extinct species of sea snail, a marine gastropod mollusk in the family Turridae, the turrids.

Distribution
Fossils of this extinct species were found in Tertiary strata from south-east Wairarapa, New Zealand.

References

 Vella, P. 1954. Tertiary Mollusca from south-east Wairarapa. Transactions of the Royal Society of New Zealand 81(4):539-555, pls. 25–27.µ
 Maxwell, P.A. (2009). Cenozoic Mollusca. Pp 232–254 in Gordon, D.P. (ed.) New Zealand inventory of biodiversity. Volume one. Kingdom Animalia: Radiata, Lophotrochozoa, Deuterostomia. Canterbury University Press, Christchurch

pulcherrimus
Gastropods described in 1954
Gastropods of New Zealand